Najahid dynasty (Banū Najāḥ) was a slave dynasty of Abyssinian origin founded in Zabid in the Tihama (lowlands) region of Yemen around 1050 AD. 
They faced hostilities from the Highlands dynasties of the time, chiefly the Sulayhids. Their last sovereign was killed by the Mahdids in 1158.

Background
The last Ziyadid king died in 1018, leaving a child behind. The guardianship of the child was assumed by an Abyssinian eunuch named al-Hussein ibn Salama. Al-Hussein ibn Salamah saved the Ziyadid Dynasty from total collapse after a devastating attack led by a highland emir named Abdullah ibn Qahtan in 989. Ibn Salama recovered the original limits of the Ziyadid kingdom from Haly (present day Saudi Arabia) to Aden, As vizier, he had two Abyssinian slaves named Nafis and Najah appointed as administrators. Najah would become the founder of what is now called the Najahid Dynasty. Nafis killed the child king of the Ziyadid dynasty. The murdered king was the last of his race. With him the Arab dynasty of Banu Ziyad came to an end in Tihama, and their power passed into the hands of their slaves. Najah, on hearing of the treatment his master had undergone at the hands of Nafis, marched toward Zabid and killed Nafis by immuring him in a wall in 1050 (or, according to some chronicles, 1022). He adopted the use of royal umbrella and struck the coinage in his name. Najah lost Aden to the Banu Ma'an Dynasty, only Zabid remained under his possession. Being of an Abyssinian slave origin, Najah was not recognized as a sovereign by the tribal elements in the Yemeni highlands. He belonged to an ancient Abyssinian tribe called "Jazal". The Najahid dynasty followed Sunni Islam.

Struggle with the Sulayhids

A decade later, Ali al-Sulayhi founded an Ismaili Shia dynasty in the highlands. He marched toward Zabid and killed Najah, forcing his sons to flee to Dahlak in 1060. Najah had four sons, two of them committed suicide while in Dahlak.

Ali al-Sulayhi had visited Zabid before his career of conquests. Tihama's inhabitants are of mixed Arab and African ancestry contrary to the Yemeni population in the highlands. The former Ziyadid Dynasty of Zabid brought shiploads of Abyssinian slaves to the city. Ali al-Sulayhi was invited to a meal by a black notable from the city but Ali rejected him and replied by citing a poem of Al-Mutanabbi:
Who hath taught the mutilated Negro the performance of generous deeds?
His noble minded masters or his enslaved forefathers?

Al-Sulayhi returned to Sana'a after conquering Zabid. Ali al-Sulayhi headed a pilgrimage caravan to Mecca in 1066 but was ambushed by Said al-Ahwal, one of Najah's sons who previously fled Zabid. Said al-Ahwal and his men were mistaken for servants by the Sulayhids. Ali al-Sulayhi was killed and al-Ahwal imprisoned his wife Asma bint Shihab. Asma bint Shihab wrote to her son Ahmed al-Mukarram from Zabid :

Al-Mukarram assembled an army of 3,000 horsemen from his own tribe and marched toward Zabid to free his mother from captivity. The Najahid slave army was defeated and immense numbers were slain. Said al-Ahwal fled the battle field again to Dahlak. Ahmed al-Mukaram found out later that his mother was not pregnant, she thought to excite and stimulate her son to vindication of his honor. Ahmed al-Mukarram appointed his uncle As'ad ibn Shihab to govern Zabid and its dependencies in Tihama and returned to Sana'a. In 1087, Said al-Ahwal returned to Zabid but was killed that same year by Ahmed al-Mukkaram. Jayyash, another son of Najah, fled to India. Jayyash returned to Zabid in 1089 disguised as an Indian. Being a Sunni, he enjoyed the support of Zabid population and easily gained power in the city. A dispute between two Sulayhids officials in Zabid played into his hands, Jayyash overheard one of them tell the other:
 
Jayyash did not kill the Sulayhid governor of Zabid, but sent him with his family to Sana'a. Jayyash continued to rule securely with no hardship from the Highlands until his demise in 1104. He was succeeded by his son al-Fatik, who however was opposed by his brothers Ibrahim and Abdulwahed. al-Fatik died in 1106 and his successor Mansur was installed as a vassal of the Sulayhids in Zabid.

Fall

In 1130, Mansur (Sulayhids vassal) died peacefully and his son al-Fatik II succeeded him. He died after 3 years. With him the dynasty came to an end. A vizier named Anis al-Fatiki, held power and struck coinage in his name in Zabid while keeping al-fatik III as a figurehead. Queen Arwa al-Sulayhi, the last Sulayhid sovereign died in 1138. After her demise, Yemen was split between several contenders. Zaydi Immamte was revived in Najran, Sa'dah, and Jawf after 72 years of absence. The Hamdanid sultans were sovereign of Sana'a and Najahid viziers were ruling Zabid independently. Anis al-Fatiki was slain by another vizier named Manallah al-Fatiki. An Arab named Ali ibn Mahdi al-Himyari, native of the Yemeni Highlands, founded the Mahdid dynasty in Tihama. Ibn Mahdi and his followers burned down several districts north of Zabid. He had sworn to bring the Abyssinians back to slavery and ordered his men to kill everyone including the handicapped. Out of desperation, the people of Zabid sought assistance from the Zaydi imam Ahmed ibn Sulayman against al-Himyari. The Zaydi imam ordered Fatiq III to be executed. Fatiq III was either killed by the Imam, the Mahdids, or his own soldiers. With this event, the slave dynasty came an end and the Mahdids took over Zabid in 1158.

Origin, identity, and legacy 

The Najahids can be considered a Neo-Aksumite state, but this opinion becomes weak because the Semitic and Semitized Aksumite elite evaded enslavement and managed to retain a high social status within the Yemeni society (The ruling class Al Nagashi clan that remained autonomous till present time, the military Al-Saidi Clan that occupies many valleys in Yemen, the sea-faring Al-Aksum clan that eventually expanded to the Persian Gulf).  However, a large part of the Aksumite & their descendants became enslaved by the Ziyadids, those enslaved Aksumites were of diverse East African origins, joined later by waves of new slaves.  The lack of a common tribal origin might have helped the Najahids develop a strong political identity that helped them stay unified vs the influence of the Highlanders. They were relied upon for the army, administration and 
agricultural labour. The Najahid were the first and only hereditary black slave ruling house established in Yemen. Once they had lost their sovereignty, these "slaves" retained a separate ethnic identity, and simply have become just another social group within Yemeni society. It is difficult to establish some link between them and al-Akhdam (servants) or "Hujur" in southern Yemen however, Yemenis believe them to be of Abyssinian or other African origin. They were still described as 'abid (slaves) in the Yemeni chronicles as late as the 16th century. But it is not clear whether they were real slaves or this was just a term used to define their ethnic and social position. These "slaves" are not segregated from the rest of society in Zabid as they are in the highlands.

List of rulers
 al-Mu'ayyad Najah 1050−1060
 Sa'id al-Ahwal 1081−1088 (son)
 Abu't-Tami Jayyash 1089−1104 (brother)
 al-Fatiq I 1104-1106 (son)
 al-Mansur 1106−1130 (son)
 al-Fatiq II 1130−1133 (son)
 al-Fatiq III 1133−1158 (first cousin)

References

Literature
 Henry Cassels Kay (1999), Yaman: its early medieval history, Adegi Graphics LLC. .

Islamic history of Yemen
Sunni dynasties
11th century in Yemen
12th century in Yemen
Arab slave owners